The Peugeot Type 175 was a fairly large sports car from Peugeot produced in 1923 and 1924. This model was produced at the factory in Audincourt. The OHV engine, of the LA5 range, displaced 3.0 L (2951 cc, 180 cid) and has a 4 speed gearbox. It was only available with the "torpedo sport" or "torpedo grand sport" body at the price of 38,000 old Francs. Colours offered were blue, grey, green or red, with black wings and chassis. The body was made of a wooden frame with steel; the bonnet was made of aluminium with a sloping, nickel-plated window. Blériot headlights and a 12V SEV magneto and starter were fitted.
In 1924, H. Petit won the 3-litre category of the 1100 km Paris-Nice race in this model: The "Paris Nice" Peugeot 175 Torpedo Grand Sport

A total of only 303 were made and only 4 original and complete surviving cars are known today (3 in France and 1 type 175 in Belgium). One of these cars is exhibited in the Musée de l'Aventure Peugeot. Besides these, a complete chassis with all the mechanics survived in New Zealand and also a fast looking modified "special" in France with a non original engine.

Gallery

References
Peugeot Car Models from 1910 to 1949

Type 175
Cars introduced in 1923